2chan may refer to:
 Futaba Channel or 2chan, a Japanese imageboard
 2channel or 2chan, a Japanese textboard

See also
 2CH (disambiguation)
 Channel 2 (disambiguation)